Edgardo Donato (April 14, 1897 – February 15, 1963) was a tango composer and orchestra leader, born in Buenos Aires, Argentina, raised from a young age and musically trained in Montevideo, Uruguay.

External links

Donato notes at Totango.net
Donato biography at Todotango.com 
 
 Edgardo Donato recordings at the Discography of American Historical Recordings.

Tango musicians
1897 births
1963 deaths
Burials at La Chacarita Cemetery